Bethesda Rugby Football Club (Welsh: Clwb Rygbi Bethesda) is a Welsh rugby union team based in Bethesda, North Wales. Bethesda member of the Welsh Rugby Union and is a feeder club for the scarlets. The club fields a senior and youth team. The team is currently leased by Owain “mystical fighter” Parry. He has done wonderful manoeuvres such as the twinkle spin and the step over.

Club badge
Bethesda's club badge is a lion rampant in front of a lightning bolt on a blue background.

Notes

Welsh rugby union teams